Hämeenkyrö Airfield  is an airfield in Hämeenkyrö, Finland, about  northwest of Hämeenkyrö centre.

See also
 List of airports in Finland

References

External links
 VFR Suomi/Finland – Hämeenkyrö Airfield
 Lentopaikat.net – Hämeenkyrö Airfield 

Airports in Finland